Galvanization or galvanizing (also spelled galvanisation or galvanising) is the process of applying a protective zinc coating to steel or iron, to prevent rusting. The most common method is hot-dip galvanizing, in which the parts are submerged in a bath of hot, molten zinc.

Protective action
The zinc coating, when intact, prevents corrosive substances from reaching the underlying iron.  Additional electroplating such as a chromate conversion coating may be applied to provide further surface passivation to the substrate material.

History and etymology

The process is named after the Italian physician, physicist, biologist and philosopher  Luigi Galvani (9 September 1737 – 4 December 1798). The earliest known example of galvanized iron was encountered by Europeans on 17th-century Indian armour in the Royal Armouries Museum collection. 

The term "galvanized" can also be used metaphorically of any stimulus which results in activity by a person or group of people. 
 
In modern usage, the term "galvanizing" has largely come to be associated with zinc coatings, to the exclusion of other metals. Galvanic paint, a precursor to hot-dip galvanizing, was patented by Stanislas Sorel, of Paris, on June 10, 1837, as an adoption of a term from a highly fashionable field of contemporary science, despite having no evident relation to it.

Methods
Hot-dip galvanizing deposits a thick, robust layer of zinc iron alloys on the surface of a steel item. In the case of automobile bodies, where additional decorative coatings of paint will be applied, a thinner form of galvanizing is applied by electrogalvanizing. The hot-dip process generally does not reduce strength to a measurable degree, with the exception of high-strength steels where hydrogen embrittlement can become a problem. 

Thermal diffusion galvanizing, or Sherardizing, provides a zinc diffusion coating on iron- or copper-based materials.

Eventual corrosion

Galvanized steel can last for many decades if other supplementary measures are maintained, such as paint coatings and additional sacrificial anodes. The rate of corrosion in non-salty environments is caused mainly by levels of sulfur dioxide in the air.

Galvanized construction steel
This is the most common use for galvanized metal, and hundreds of thousands of tons of steel products are galvanized annually worldwide. In developed countries most larger cities have several galvanizing factories, and many items of steel manufacture are galvanized for protection. Typically these include: street furniture, building frameworks, balconies, verandahs, staircases, ladders, walkways, and more. Hot dip galvanized steel is also used for making steel frames as a basic construction material for steel frame buildings.

Galvanized piping
 
In the early 20th century, galvanized piping replaced previously-used cast iron and lead in cold-water plumbing. Typically, galvanized piping rusts from the inside out, building up layers of plaque on the inside of the piping, causing both water pressure problems and eventual pipe failure. These plaques can flake off, leading to visible impurities in water and a slight metallic taste. The life expectancy of galvanized piping is about 40–50 years, but it may vary on how well the pipes were built and installed. Pipe longevity also depends on the thickness of zinc in the original galvanizing, which ranges on a scale from G01 to G360.

See also 

 Aluminized steel
 Cathodic protection
 Corrugated galvanized iron
 Galvanic corrosion
 Galvannealed – galvanization and annealing
 Prepainted metal
 Rust
 Rustproofing
 Sendzimir process
 Sherardizing
 Corrosion
 Sacrificial metal
 Corrosion engineering

References

External links

Chemical processes
Corrosion prevention
Metal plating
Zinc
Bimetal